Paul Abadie (9 November 1812 – 3 August 1884) was a French architect and building restorer.  He is considered a central representative of French historicism.  He was the son of architect Paul Abadie Sr.

Abadie worked on the restoration of Notre-Dame de Paris, Église Sainte-Croix of Bordeaux, Saint-Pierre of Angoulême and Saint-Front of Périgueux. He won the competition in 1873  to design the Basilica of the Sacré Cœur on Montmartre in Paris, and saw construction commence on it, though he died long before its completion in 1914.

Biography
Paul Abadie (Jr.) was born on 9 November 1812 in Paris, France. He was the son of Paul Abadie Sr., who was also an architect in France. He entered the School of Fine Arts (École des Beaux-Arts) in 1835; under the direction of the Monsieur Achille Leclère.

As attaché to the commission for historical monuments, he participated in the architectural rediscovery of the Middle Ages, touring and studying medieval sites intensively.  Abadie was known to be interested in the restoration of medieval monuments and buildings; namely the Church of S. Front and the Cathedral of Angoulême. He also designed the Hotel de Ville at Angoulême. 

In 1845 he became second inspector for the restoration of Notre Dame de Paris, under the directorship of architects Violet le Duc and Lassus.  In 1862 he was appointed as the diocesan architect for the Saint André Cathedral of Bordeaux, where he had already restored the facade of the church Saint-Croix (1859-1865).

In 1871 he became a member of the commission for historical monuments. In 1872 he became the general inspector of diocesan buildings, then in 1874 the diocesan architect for Paris, replacing Eugène Viollet-le-Duc, who had resigned from that post.

In 1873 his entry in the competition for the construction of a basilica on Montmartre, a hill dominating Paris, was selected ahead of 12 other submissions, by Cardinal Joseph Guibert. The design became the basis for the Sacré-Cœur, Paris, which Abadie began in 1875 but did not finish. In 1874 he replaced Viollet-le-Duc as architect of Notre Dame of Paris. In 1875, he was elected to membership of the Académie des Beaux Arts.

Apart from ecclesiastical and state commissions, Abadie is known to have only accepted one private commission, Mailleberchie Castle, in 1875, which he designed in great detail, as a complete neo-medieval work of art, including stone carvings, gargoyles, stained glass windows, metalwork, wood carvings, furnishings, upholstery, wall fabrics and wallpapers.

Abadie began the Basilica of Sacré Cœur, but he died during its construction, on 3 August 1884, in Chatou, (departement of Yvelines). France.

List of works

Constructions
 Basilica Sacré-Cœur, Paris, France
 Church of Chatou, France
 Neo-romanic Church of Saint-Georges of Mussidan, France
 Mailleberchie Castle, Villebois-Lavalette, France

Restorations
 Notre Dame de Paris (initially under supervision of Viollet-le-Duc)
 Church Sainte-Croix Bordeaux Church
 Saint-Michel Tower, Bordeaux, France
 Saint-Ferdinand Church, Bordeaux, France
 Church of the Bastide (Église de la Bastide), Bordeaux, France
 Sacristy of the Saint-André Cathedral, Bordeaux, France
 Great Synagogue of Bordeaux, Bordeaux, France
 Saint Front Périgueux Cathedral, Périgueux, France
 Saint-Georges Church, Périgueux, France
 Saint-Pierre Abbey of Brantôme, France
 Angoulême Cathedral, Angoulême, France
 Saint-Etienne Cathedral, Cahors, France
 Saint-Léger Church, Cognac, France
 Château d'Angoulême, Angoulême, France
 Saint-Martial Church, Angoulême, France
 Sacre Coeur, Paris, France

Other
 Grave monument for Jean-Louis Guez de Balzac, Hôtel Dieu (Chapel), Angoulême, France

Legacy and influence
The work of Paul Abadie was not appreciated by some academics in the mid-twentieth century, as they felt he was fanciful, destroyed much Romanesque heritage, and had no compunction about adding whimsical sculptures of his own manufacture on capitals and corbels.  An example of his willful implantations of false Romanesque sculpture is to be found in the clover-leaf church of St Michel d'Entraygues near Angoulême. Here, he has introduced a capital featuring a triple-headed Green Man with horns and a diabolical expression. Despite its intriguing shape, this small church has no connection with the Templars, but was built to receive pilgrims on the way to Compostela.

However, from the 1980s onwards his life-work has been positively reevaluated, in particular due to his paramount role in the neo-medieval movement, recognizing within that movement his originality versus his contemporary, Viollet-le-Duc. Many communities in the present-day Charente and Dordogne departments are indebted to him for the restoration of a large number of ecclesiastical buildings, many that were in severe disrepair or simply neglected over centuries, for example in Angoulême, Périgueux, and Cahors, where from 1849 onwards he was the diocesan architect for those dioceses.  His works, in particular Sacré Cœur, inspired many devotional and pilgrimage basilicas, for example the Basilica of the Sacred Heart, Brussels, (Koekelberg), 1919–1960, by Albert van Huffel, or the basilica Sainte-Thérèse de Lisieux, 1928–1954, by Louis-Marie Cordonnier.  He also inspired a large number of churches, most notably in Paris (Saint-Esprit, 1928–1935, by Paul Tournon; Saint-Pierre-de-Chaillot, 1931–1938, by Émile Bois; and Sainte-Odile, 1934–1946, by Jacques Barge).

References

19th-century French architects
1812 births
1884 deaths
École des Beaux-Arts alumni
Architects from Paris
Gothic Revival architects